The Yakovlev Yak-8 was a Soviet utility aircraft developed during World War II. It was not accepted for production, but received the NATO reporting name "Crib" anyway.

Development
The Yak-8 was an improved version of the Yakovlev Yak-6. It was slightly enlarged but retained its predecessor's mixed construction and general layout. The wooden semi-monocoque forward and central fuselage sections were skinned with a  layer of plywood both inside and outside. The rear fuselage was made from a tubular steel framework covered by fabric. The two-spar wooden wing was made in a single piece with fabric-covered ailerons. The main undercarriage retracted rearwards into the rear of the engine nacelles, but the castoring tailwheel was non-retractable. Two  Kossov M-12 engines were originally intended to be used, but they were unavailable and the  Shvetsov M-11FM had to be used instead. The Yak-8 was a dedicated transport so its fuselage was deeper than that of the Yak-6. This gave much more headroom for passengers and six could be accommodated rather than the four of its predecessor.

Two prototypes were built with the first flying in early 1944. The second prototype was some  lighter than the first one and passed its State acceptance tests. It was recommended for production, but never ordered, probably because the Soviets had begun to switch over to all-metal aircraft.

Specifications

References

Citations

Bibliography

 
 

1940s Soviet military utility aircraft
Yak-008
World War II Soviet aircraft
Abandoned military aircraft projects of the Soviet Union
Aircraft first flown in 1944
Twin piston-engined tractor aircraft